DeRodrick "Keyon" Nash (born March 11, 1979) is an American football safety who was drafted by the Oakland Raiders in the 2002 NFL Draft. He played college football at Albany State.

He has also been a member of the Rhein Fire and Toronto Argonauts.

Early years
Nash attended Miller County High School in Colquitt, Georgia.

Professional career

Oakland Raiders
Nash was drafted by the Oakland Raiders in the sixth round (189th overall) of the 2002 NFL Draft.

Toronto Argonauts
Nash signed with the Toronto Argonauts of the Canadian Football League on April 26, 2007, but was released on June 19, 2007.

References

1979 births
Living people
People from Colquitt, Georgia
American football safeties
Albany State Golden Rams football players
Oakland Raiders players
Rhein Fire players
Toronto Argonauts players
Players of American football from Georgia (U.S. state)